Milen Ruskov (Bulgarian: Милен Русков) (1966), a Bulgarian writer and translator. He graduated from Sofia University in 1995.

Awards and honours
2014 European Union Prize for Literature, Bulgaria, Vazvishenie (Summit)

Works 
Novels
 Pocket Encyclopaedia of Mysteries (2004);
 Thrown into Nature (2008, BG; 2011, U.S.);
 Vazvishenie (Summit) (2011);
 Chamkoria (2017).

References

External links 
 Milen Ruskov's Profile at the Contemporary Bulgarian Writers Website
 Milen Ruskov at the Open Letter's Website
 Milen Ruskov at LiterNet

1966 births
Living people
Bulgarian novelists
Male novelists
Bulgarian historical fiction writers
Bulgarian male writers
Bulgarian translators
20th-century Bulgarian novelists
21st-century Bulgarian novelists